Joseph Wright may refer to:

Joseph Wright of Derby (1734–1797), English painter
Joseph Wright (American painter) (1756–1793), American portraitist
Joseph Wright (fl. 1837/1845), whose company, Messrs. Joseph Wright and Sons, became the Metropolitan Railway Carriage and Wagon Company Ltd
Joseph A. Wright (1810–1867), governor of Indiana
Joseph Wright (architect) (1818–1885), English architect 
Joseph Wright (greyhound trainer) (1824–1908)
Joseph Farrall Wright (1827–1883), Anglican priest and founder of English football club Bolton Wanderers
Joseph Wright (linguist) (1855–1930), English philologist
Joseph Wright (rower) (1864–1950), Canadian rower
Joseph C. Wright (1892–1985), American art director
Joseph Wright Jr. (rower) (1906–1981), Canadian rower
Joe Wright (rugby league) (Joseph Wright, 1908–1967), English rugby league footballer 
Joe Wright (businessman) (Joseph R. Wright, born 1938), director of the United States Office of Management and Budget
Joseph Wright (illustrator) (1947–2017), English illustrator and cartoonist
Joseph Wright (Mississippi politician) (1952–2022), American politician

See also
 Joe Wright (disambiguation)
 Joey Wright (born 1968), retired American basketball player